Kari Grossmann (born 1942) is a Norwegian artist and children's writer. One of Norway's most popular illustrators, she has been called the Queen of Norwegian Everyday Picture Books. Her books in the Lillesøster (Little Sister) series are popular in both Norway and Denmark.

References

1942 births
Living people
Norwegian writers
Norwegian illustrators
Norwegian children's book illustrators
Norwegian women illustrators
Norwegian women artists
People from Trondheim
20th-century Norwegian women writers
20th-century Norwegian writers
21st-century Norwegian writers
Norwegian children's writers
21st-century Norwegian women writers